Pakir Mahmud (also Romanized as Pakīr Maḩmūd) is a village in Qorqori Rural District, Qorqori District, Hirmand County, Sistan and Baluchestan Province, Iran. At the 2006 census, its population was 115, in 20 families.

References 

Populated places in Hirmand County